Landywood is a small village in Staffordshire, England. Landywood forms part of the parish and village of Great Wyrley, and together with Great Wyrley and Cheslyn Hay, forms a community with a combined population in 2001 of almost 20,000. For the population as taken at the 2011 census see Great Wyrley.

The village lies within the district of South Staffordshire, and is separated from the town of Cannock to the north by the M6 Toll motorway, and the A5 road. It is served by Landywood railway station on the Chase Line, which runs from Birmingham via Walsall to Rugeley Trent Valley. National Express West Midlands bus service X51 provides a connection to Cannock via the McArthurGlen Designer outlet as well as Walsall, Bloxwich, Great Barr and Birmingham. D&G Chaserider service 1A connects Landywood with Cheslyn Hay to and from Cannock and Walsall. Chaserider 71 links Landywood with Huntington, Cannock, Essington, Wednesfield and Wolverhampton.

Landywood is part of the South Staffordshire ward named "Great Wyrley Landywood", which is just over one mile south of the Great Wyrley ward. It also lies slightly under three miles north of Bloxwich, just over three miles south from Cannock and five-and-a-half miles north from Walsall.

The exact boundaries of Landywood are uncertain, but their proximation on maps may roughly locate the area as stretching from Landywood railway station down to Holly Lane, on which Landywood Primary School is located, and the southernmost point of Landywood and the Great Wyrley parish.

References

External links

Villages in Staffordshire
South Staffordshire District